Filinvest Development Corporation is the publicly listed holding company for the various firms in the Filinvest group. It was established in 1955 in the Philippines by Andrew L. Gotianun Sr. and his wife, Mercedes Gotianun, as a used-car financing company. It has holdings in real estate development and leasing, the sales of housing units, and hotel and resort management, banking and financial services, sugar and power. It is based in Metro Manila, Philippines, and is owned by the Gotianun family.

Filinvest Development Corporation is involved in the hotel and tourism industry, and owns the hotel brands Crimson and Quest, the latter of which is a new value-brand hotel. In September 2014, it was reported that it planned on opening 5,000 hotel rooms within five years. At that time, company officials stated that it had over 1,000 hotel rooms. During this time it was also reported that the company was building seven hotels, two of which will be under the new Quest value brand.

In 1996, the company owned approximately 4,000 acres "of prime real estate around Manila", along with land in Cebu and Fort Bonifacio.

Subsidiaries

Banking and finance
EastWest Banking Corporation – is a universal bank in the Philippines known as EastWest Unibank. Its headquarters is at The Beaufort, the flagship luxury condominium project of Filinvest Development Corporation in Bonifacio Global City with extension offices at PBCom Tower Makati (Call Center Division), Hanston Building (Customer Care), and Pasong Tamo Extension (formerly the country head office of Levi's Philippines).
 EastWest Rural Bank, Inc. – or EWRB is a premier rural bank and a wholly owned subsidiary of EastWest Banking Corporation and Filinvest Development Corporation. Established in 2013 when EastWest Banking Corporation acquired FinMan Bank, Inc., a 16-year-old Pasig-based rural bank and Green Bank, Inc. (also known as Green Bank of Caraga), a 46-branch rural bank based in Butuan City. Before its acquisition, it was the largest rural bank in Caraga Region in terms of assets. Its headquarters is located in Pasig.
EastWest Ageas Life Insurance Corporation
EastWest Insurance Brokerage, Inc. 
EastWest Leasing and Finance Corporation

Utilities
FDC Utilities, Inc. (FDCUI) – a wholly owned subsidiary of the Filinvest Development Corporation.

Hospitality
Filinvest hotels are managed through subsidiaries Filinvest Hospitality Corporation (formerly FDC Hotels Corporation) and Chroma Hospitality, Inc. (formerly FilArchipelago Hospitality, Inc.), a joint venture with Archipelago International of Indonesia, respectively. The earlier, a wholly-owned subsidiary was formed to serve as the
primary developer and owners’ representative of Group-owned properties. On the other hand, through Chroma, FDC caters to various segments of the hospitality sector through the 5-star Crimson brand, 3-star Quest brand and Crimson Resort and Spa in Boracay.

Real estate
Filinvest Alabang, Inc. (FAI) – was incorporated on August 25, 1993, in connection with the development of Filinvest City in Alabang, a joint venture with the government's Public Estates Authority. Filinvest City, a 244-hectare mixed-use development project located at the southern end of Metro Manila and adjacent to the South Luzon Expressway in Alabang.
Filinvest Land, Inc. – is a real estate firm subsidiary of Filinvest Development Corporation also owned by the Gotianun family. The company is into mall operation, subdivision, and mid rise and high rise condominium development. It has landbanks in Luzon, Visayas, and Mindanao, aimed at future developments projects of its parent firm. Developed Timberland Heights in San Mateo, Rizal, Philippines, a 677-hectare suburban housing community. Part of the community's design included incorporating elements of sustainable development, such as preserving the area's natural landscape, the planting of 10,000 trees, and stipulating a requirement that buyers are to plant "at least one tree for every 250 square meters of their lots". These various programs are overseen by the "Department of Environment and Natural Resources and the forester employed by the township". The community also has a nursery where various species of trees are grown.
Filinvest Lifemalls
The Palms Country Club
Cyberzone Properties, Inc.

Transportation
 LIPAD Corporation (operator of Clark International Airport) – a consortium with JG Summit Holdings, Philippine Airport Ground Support Solutions Inc., and Changi Airports Philippines Pte. Ltd.

Others
ALG Holdings, Inc.
Filinvest Asia Corporation
Davao Sugar Central Corporation
Pacific Sugar Holdings

See also

 List of companies of the Philippines
 Festival Supermall

References

Further reading

External links
 

Real estate companies of the Philippines
Companies listed on the Philippine Stock Exchange
Conglomerate companies of the Philippines
Holding companies of the Philippines
Companies based in Bonifacio Global City